|}

This is a list of electoral region results for the Western Australian Legislative Council in the 1980 Western Australian state election.

Results by Electoral province

Central 

|- style="background-color:#E9E9E9"
! colspan="6" style="text-align:left;" |After distribution of preferences

 Preferences were not distributed to completion.

East Metropolitan

Lower Central

Lower North 

 Preferences were not distributed.

Lower West

Metropolitan

North

North Metropolitan

North-East Metropolitan

South

South Metropolitan

South-East

South-East Metropolitan

South-West

Upper West

West

See also 

 Results of the Western Australian state election, 1980 (Legislative Assembly)
 1980 Western Australian state election
 Candidates of the 1980 Western Australian state election
 Members of the Western Australian Legislative Council, 1980–1983

References 

Results of Western Australian elections
1980 elections in Australia